Deglos is a settlement on the island of Saint Lucia; it is located at the northern end of the island towards its heart, between Trois Pitons and Barre Denis.  In 2001 it had a population of 112 people in 30 households.

References

Towns in Saint Lucia